KLOR may refer to:

 KLOR-FM, a radio station (99.3 FM) licensed to Ponca City, Oklahoma, United States
 Lowe Army Heliport
 KLOR-TV, a television station licensed to Portland, Oregon, United States, merged into KPTV in 1957
 KBYU-TV, a television station licensed to Provo, Utah, United States, which held the call sign KLOR-TV from 1958 to 1962